In 2000, the United States presidential election in New Jersey, along with every U.S. state and Washington, D.C., took place on November 7, 2000 as part of the 2000 United States presidential election. The major party candidates were Democratic Vice President Al Gore of the incumbent administration and Republican Governor of Texas George W. Bush, son of the 41st U.S. president, George H. W. Bush. Owing to the indirect system of voting used in U.S. presidential elections, George W. Bush narrowly defeated Gore in Electoral College votes despite that Gore earned a higher percentage of the popular vote. Green Party candidate Ralph Nader, the only third-party candidate represented on most states' ballots, came in a distant third.

Although New Jersey had voted for Democrat Bill Clinton in the past two elections (1992 and 1996), it was considered a potential swing state in 2000 because pre-election polling data showed it to be a close race. Al Gore won 56% of NJ's popular vote, beating out George W. Bush by about a 16% margin, with Gore's biggest margins of victory in Essex County and Hudson County where he won over 70% of the vote. Bush won 7 counties with his biggest margins being just over 57% in Hunterdon County and Sussex County. Nader got over 4% of the vote in counties in the northwest of the state, while taking 3% statewide. This was also the first presidential election since 1976, in which New Jersey would back the losing candidate as well. , this is the last election in which Monmouth County voted for the Democratic candidate.

Bush became the first Republican to win the White House without carrying Bergen County, Burlington County, or Monmouth County, as well as the state of New Jersey since Benjamin Harrison in 1888. Bush became the first Republican to win without Union County since James A. Garfield in 1880. Bush was the first Republican to ever win the Presidency without Passaic and Gloucester counties, and the only Republican to ever win without Salem County.

New Jersey was 1 of 10 states to back George H. W Bush in 1988 George W. Bush failed to carry in either of his presidential wins.

General Election

Polling

Results

By county

Counties that flipped from Democratic to Republican
Cape May (largest municipality: Lower Township)
Ocean (largest municipality: Lakewood Township)

By congressional district
Gore won 11 of 13 congressional districts, including four that elected Republicans.

Electors

Technically the voters of NJ cast their ballots for electors: representatives to the Electoral College. NJ is allocated 15 electors because it has 13 congressional districts and 2 senators. All candidates who appear on the ballot or qualify to receive write-in votes must submit a list of 15 electors, who pledge to vote for their candidate and his or her running mate. Whoever wins the majority of votes in the state is awarded all 15 electoral votes. Their chosen electors then vote for president and vice president. Although electors are pledged to their candidate and running mate, they are not obligated to vote for them. An elector who votes for someone other than his or her candidate is known as a faithless elector.

The electors of each state and the District of Columbia met on December 18, 2000 to cast their votes for president and vice president. The Electoral College itself never meets as one body. Instead the electors from each state and the District of Columbia met in their respective capitols.

The following were the members of the Electoral College from the state. All were pledged to and voted for Gore and Lieberman:

Paul M. Bangiola
Angelo R. Bianchi
Mamie Bridgeforth
Dennis P. Collins
John Garrett
Deborah Lynch
Patricia McCullough
John McGreevey
June B. Montag
Jeffrey L. Nash
Barbara A. Plumeri
Julia Valdivia
Stephen S. Weinstein
Charles Wowkanech

See also
 United States presidential elections in New Jersey
 Presidency of George W. Bush

References

New Jersey
2000
2000 New Jersey elections